Vovk is a surname of Ukrainian origin that means wolf. It currently predominates among East and South Slavs in Ukraine, Belarus, Slovenia, and Croatia. Notable people with the surname include:
Aleš Vovk, member of Slovene duo Maraaya
Andrey Vovk (born 1991), Ukrainian chess player
Andriy Vovk, Ukrainian defence minister
Anton Vovk (1900–1963), Slovenian Roman Catholic archbishop
Fedir Vovk (1847–1918), Ukrainian anthropologist, archaeologist and museum curator
Frančiška Vovk (1860–1932), Slovenian poet and lyricist
Marjetka Vovk, member of Slovene duo Maraaya
Melita Vovk (born 1928), Slovenian painter and illustrator
Vira Vovk (1926–2022), Ukrainian-born Brazilian writer, critic and translator
Yuri Vovk (born 1988), Ukrainian chess player

See also
 
Vovk (river), a tributary of the Southern Bug in Ukraine

Surnames of Ukrainian origin
Ukrainian-language surnames
Slovene-language surnames